Meir Yechiel Halevi Halstock (1852-11 March 1928) also known as the Ostrovtser Rebbe was a Hassidic rabbi who spent much of his life based in the city of Ostrowiec Świętokrzyski.

Early life 
Halstock was born in Savin, near Kraków where his father and grandfather before him worked as a bakers.

He was a child prodigy and his capabilities were far beyond the local teachers. At the age of 10 he was brought to Rabbi Elimelech of Grodzisk, who he impressed and he was left in his care to study Torah.

At the age of 28 he was appointed the rabbi of Sakranovitz. Because of his youth the town requested that he get semicha from a number of specific rabbis including Josua Heschel Kuttner. Kuttner was so impressed by the intellect of Halstock that in his letter of approbation he wrote "how can a fly with his wings cut off give testimony about an eagle that soars in the sky".

Rabbi of Ostrowiec 
Halstock was appointed the rabbi of Ostrowiec in south central Poland. He was extreme in his ascetic worldview. For the last 40 years of his life he would not eat through the day, and would only have a small meal at night. The exception to this was during Shabbat and the festivals.

By the end of his life many of his organs had shut down because of the years of fasting, and he was left bed ridden and constantly cold.

Halstock was also a brilliant mathematician, a skill he demonstrated in some of his commentaries with the development of particularly difficult Gematrias and complex mathematical formulas to explain passages in the Talmud.

He donated a portion of his wages to charities in Palestine. 

Following his death he was succeeded in his position by his son, Yehezkel, who was murdered by the Nazis.

Desecration of grave 
Halstock's grave has been desecrated a number of times by the local Polish community.

His grave was destroyed during the Holocaust and was rededicated by the surviving community after the war. In 2018 the grave was again desecrated by local vandals.

References 

1852 births
1928 deaths

Polish Hasidic rabbis
Hasidic rebbes
Hasidic Judaism in Poland
Polish Zionists